William Gonnerman House is a historic home located at Mount Vernon, Posey County, Indiana.  It was built between about 1887 and 1895, and is a massive two-story, irregular plan, Free Classic style frame dwelling. It sits on a brick and concrete block foundation and has a hipped and gable roof.  It features a wraparound porch with 18 fluted columns and a porte cochere.  A sun porch wing was added in the 1930s.  Also on the property are the contributing carriage house and smokehouse.

It was listed on the National Register of Historic Places in 1985.

References

Houses on the National Register of Historic Places in Indiana
Houses completed in 1895
Neoclassical architecture in Indiana
Houses in Posey County, Indiana
National Register of Historic Places in Posey County, Indiana